The 2012 National Camogie League, known for sponsorship reasons as the Irish Daily Star National Camogie League, commenced in February 2012 and was won by Cork.

References 

League
National Camogie League seasons